The Men's singles competition at the 2019 FIL World Luge Championships was held on 27 January 2019.

Results
The first run was held at 11:10 and the second run at 13:18.

References

Men's singles